Schwer is a surname. Notable people with the surname include:

Andreas Schwer (born 1966), German manager
Billy Schwer (born 1969), English boxer
Lea Schwer (born 1982), Swiss volleyball player

See also
r-colored vowel

Surnames of German origin